James Parker Joyce (17 March 1834 – 16 January 1903) was a 19th-century New Zealand politician from Southland. He is regarded as an Independent, as there were no political parties in Parliament at that time.

He was born in Southampton, England, and had come to Southland from the goldfields of Ballarat and Bendigo in 1858. He was a journalist and newspaper editor.

He represented the electorates of Wallace from 1875 to 1879 when he was defeated, and then Awarua from 1881 to 1887, when he retired.

He was an editor of the Southland Times and later one of the proprietors of the Southland News, where he was an editor for many years. His eldest son, James Frederick Parker Joyce (27 November 1864 – 29 August 1939), also worked for the Southland News for 55 years, including as editor, before his death in 1939 at age 74.

Parker Joyce's great great great grandson is New Zealand filmmaker and rugby player Winston Cowie.

References

External links  

|-

1834 births
1903 deaths
Burials at Eastern Cemetery, Invercargill
Members of the New Zealand House of Representatives
Independent MPs of New Zealand
New Zealand MPs for South Island electorates
Unsuccessful candidates in the 1879 New Zealand general election
19th-century New Zealand politicians
19th-century New Zealand journalists
British emigrants to New Zealand